Ficker may refer to:

 Bill Ficker, American yachtsman, captain of the Intrepid
 Desirée Ficker (born 1976), American long-distance runner
 Heinrich von Ficker (1881 - 1957), German-Austrian meteorologist
 Julius von Ficker (1826 — 1902), German historian
 Peter Ficker (born 1951), Brazilian sailor
 Robin Ficker (born 1943), American attorney
 Suzanne Farrell (born Roberta Sue Ficker), American dancer
Surnames from nicknames